Back 2 Life is the third studio album by Jamaican-American singer Sean Kingston. The album was released on September 10, 2013. The album was supported by the single "Beat It" which peaked at number 52 on the Billboard Hot 100. The album features guest appearances from T.I., Chris Brown, Wiz Khalifa, Wale, Yo Gotti, Busta Rhymes and 2 Chainz.

Singles
On July 23, 2010, the first promotional single, produced by Paul A., "Letting Go (Dutty Love)" featuring Nicki Minaj, was released. On August 3, the music video was released. On September 7, the second promotional single "Dumb Love" was released. On December 21, the third promotional single "Party All Night (Sleep All Day)" was released, followed by its music video on December 23. On June 5, 2012, the album's lead single "Back 2 Life (Live It Up)" featuring T.I. and produced by Paul A. was released. A music video followed on June 8, 2012. On November 16, the fourth promotional single "Rum and Raybans" featuring Cher Lloyd was released, with its music video released on November 18. On April 15, 2013, the second single "Beat It" featuring Chris Brown and Wiz Khalifa was released. On April 29, 2013, the music video was released. On September 10, 2013, the music video was released for "Seasonal Love" featuring Wale.

Critical response

Back 2 Life was met with generally mixed reviews from music critics. David Jeffries of AllMusic gave the album four out of five stars, saying "Previewed by the Soul II Soul-sampling single 'Back 2 Life (Live It Up)' featuring T.I., plus the cool and slow 'Beat It' with special guests Chris Brown and Wiz Khalifa, Sean Kingston's third album is a slick, wide-reaching affair with production coming from the likes of J.R. Rotem, Nic Nac, and RedOne. Besides the names above, the guest list reads like an all-star roster with 2 Chainz, Wale, Busta Rhymes, and Yo Gotti all lending a hand, but it's the mature Kingston who is in control and going it alone on the more sweet and sincere highlights." Brent Faulkner of PopMatters gave the album a four out of ten, saying Ultimately, Back 2 Life relies too heavily on sex and partying for its inspiration. Sure, Kingston's celebration is completely understandable, but the lack of substance beyond drinks, smoking, and hooking up truly hurts this album. Even if rationalized as a 'guilty pleasure' upon an initial listen, the 'pleasure' part of the description is most definitely arguable."

Track listing

Charts

References

2013 albums
Sean Kingston albums
Albums produced by J. R. Rotem
Epic Records albums